Mochammad Junda Irawan (born 31 May 1996, in Malang) is an Indonesian professional footballer who plays as a defender.

Club career

Early career
In April 2014, Junda ever selection in Brisbane Roar Youth, and in June 2015, he returned to Malang and joined Arema FC.

Arema FC
In the opening match of Jendral Sudirman Cup, Arema FC against Persegres Gresik United. Dio Permana and Junda Irawan playing since the beginning of the game, only played 12 minutes. After that, Dio and Junda replaced by senior players, and eventually the game ended and score 4-1 for Arema.
And in the 2016 season, Junda joined in the squad of Arema in 2016 Indonesia Soccer Championship A.

Madura United
In 2018, Junda Irawan signed a contract with Indonesian Liga 1 club Madura United. He made his league debut on 3 August 2018 in a match against PS TIRA at the Gelora Ratu Pamelingan Stadium, Pamekasan.

Mitra Kukar
He was signed for Mitra Kukar to play in the Liga 2 in the 2019 season.

PSMS Medan
In 2021, Junda Irawan signed a contract with Indonesian Liga 2 club PSMS Medan.

PSG Pati
In 2021, Junda signed a contract with Indonesian Liga 2 club PSG Pati. He made his league debut on 11 October against Persijap Jepara at the Manahan Stadium, Surakarta.

International career
In 2014, Junda represented the Indonesia U-19, in the 2014 AFF U-19 Youth Championship. Junda included in U-21 team in preparation for the Cotif Tournament in Valencia, Spain, August 10–20, 2014.

Honours

Club
Arema
 Indonesia President's Cup: 2017

References

External links
 Junda Irawan Soccerway
 Junda Irawan Liga Indonesia

1996 births
Living people
Sportspeople from Malang
Indonesian footballers
Expatriate soccer players in Australia
Arema F.C. players
Indonesia youth international footballers
Association football defenders